Luis Fernando Haquin López  (born 15 November 1997) is a Bolivian professional footballer who plays for Bolivian club Bolívar as a centre-back.

Career
Haquin played for Oriente Petrolero in the Bolivian Primera División. In December 2018, it was announced that he was transferred to Puebla in the Liga MX.

On June 7, 2017 he appeared as a substitute for the Bolivia national football team against the Nicaragua national football team in a friendly.

International goals
Scores and results list Bolivia's goal tally first.

References

External links

1997 births
Living people
Sportspeople from Santa Cruz de la Sierra
Bolivian footballers
Bolivian expatriate footballers
Bolivia international footballers
Association football defenders
2019 Copa América players
2021 Copa América players
Bolivia youth international footballers
Bolivian Primera División players
Chilean Primera División players
Liga MX players
Club Puebla players
Club Bolívar players
Oriente Petrolero players
Deportes Melipilla footballers
Expatriate footballers in Chile
Expatriate footballers in Mexico
Bolivian expatriate sportspeople in Chile
Bolivian expatriate sportspeople in Mexico